Santos Ferreira (born 1889, date of death unknown) was a Uruguayan fencer. He competed in the individual and team épée and team sabre events at the 1924 Summer Olympics.

References

External links
 

1889 births
Year of death missing
Uruguayan male épée fencers
Olympic fencers of Uruguay
Fencers at the 1924 Summer Olympics
Uruguayan male sabre fencers